"Teach Yourself Heath" is the name of a one-sided 33rpm flexi-disc by Monty Python which was given away free with issue 27 of ZigZag magazine in December 1972 and also included inside initial copies of their third album Monty Python's Previous Record.

Billed as "Home Tutor Language Course, Number 14 - An invaluable introduction for Beginners to the Theory and Practice of Heath", the track is introduced by Michael Palin after which Eric Idle is heard teaching the listener how to mimic the speech patterns of the then British prime minister Edward Heath. Real extracts of Heath's voice are used to demonstrate.

As Palin explained to Time Out: "Eric and I spent a day listening to Heath's speeches; at a certain point I went to sleep...I feel the record hasn't done justice to the boredom and inanity of those party political speeches. If it is funny, thank Mr Heath for that. It's all him..."

The track was released on CD in 2006 as part of the bonus tracks on the special edition release of Monty Python's Previous Record

Faux record titles

The single's back cover lists the following entries in the Home Tutor Language Course series:

 015 Teach yourself Barber
 016 Teach yourself Wilson
 017 Teach yourself Maudling * (* Deleted)
 018 Teach yourself Nabarro* (* Mono)
 019 Teach yourself Thatcher
 020 More Thatcher
 021 Advanced Thatcher for Students* (* Not available in Wales)
 022 Teach yourself Aggro
 023 Teach yourself Chataway

References

External links

Monty Python
1972 singles
Flexi discs
Edward Heath
Cultural depictions of British prime ministers
Cultural depictions of British men